Admiralty Rangers Football Club is a Singaporean football club based in Admiralty, Singapore. The official team was formed in 2018 to take part in the  Football Association of Singapore Island Wide League in order to bring the club to a higher level in Singapore football. The club made its debuting season in the FAS Island Wide League 2018.

References 

Football clubs in Singapore
2009 establishments in Singapore